The Glasscock County Courthouse is an historic courthouse building located  in Garden City, Glasscock County, Texas. Built in 1909 to 1910 at a cost of $28,000, it was designed by Georgia-born American architect Edward Columbus Hosford, who is noted for the  courthouses and other buildings that he designed in Florida, Georgia and Texas. It was built of granite and rusticated stone with gable front porticoes on all sides, each of which is supported by four 2-story Doric columns. Unlike the Mason County Courthouse also designed by Hosford  and built at the same time for $39,786, the Glasscock County Courthouse has no clock tower cupola in the center of its roof and its side porticoes are smaller than the other two.

The prior courthouse, a small 2-story stone building, still stands on the property. It was used as a jail after the present courthouse was built but is now closed.

See also

National Register of Historic Places listings in Glasscock County, Texas
List of county courthouses in Texas
Recorded Texas Historic Landmarks in Glasscock County

References

External links 
 National Register Nomination Form, Glasscock County Courthouse and Jail
 Glasscock County website
 Protection of Texas County Courthouses
 Texas Courthouse Trail: Glasscock County
Texas Escapes - Garden City - has picture of prior courthouse
  Texas Escapes: Glasscock County Courthouse
 Texas Courthouses: history of Glasscock County Courthouse
 Texas Courthouses: picture of Glasscock County Courthouse

Buildings and structures in Glasscock County, Texas
County courthouses in Texas
Edward Columbus Hosford buildings
Neoclassical architecture in Texas
Government buildings completed in 1910
Courthouses on the National Register of Historic Places in Texas
National Register of Historic Places in Glasscock County, Texas